Saliyar or Saliya or Chaliyan or Sali or Sale is an Indian caste. Their traditional occupation was that of weaving and they are found mostly in the regions of northern Kerala, southern coastal Karnataka, Andhra Pradesh and Tamil Nadu.

Caste names

The oldest names for weavers in Kannada and Telugu regions were Saliga (or its variants, Sale, Sali, Saliya etc.) or Jeda (or its variants Jada, Jandra etc.). However, the present day names like Devanga and Padmasali. The original names simply meant weaver (spider). While Saliga is tadbhava of jalikha, spider or weaver in Sanskrit, Jeda is a Kannada word for spider. According to Ramaswamy, as part of the Virasaiva movement weavers initially championed caste negation or anti-casteism initially. However, as time passed even that movement became caste-ridden and various communities started claiming ritual superiority vis-a-vis other communities part of the same religion and also against non-Virasaiva communities like Brahmins. As caste negation gave way to caste exaltation even weavers tried to obtain higher caste credentials and privileges. In 1231, at Chintamani (in the present day Karnataka region with a mixed Kannada/Telugu population) it is said (a dubious claim according to Vijaya Ramaswamy) that a king granted privileges like right to the yajnopavita (the sacred thread worn by Brahmins), right to ride a palanquin, right to one's own flag and symbol etc... to Devanga weavers. Many of these privileges were later granted to Padmashali weavers too.

Edanga and Valanga

According to Ramaswamy, Sali and Devanga weavers were always part of right hand castes while  Kaikkola Sengunthar were part of left hand castes.

Relationship to other Malayali castes
In Kannur, Ashtamachal Bhagavathy temple part of Payyannur Teru has a unique tradition of a festival called Meenamrithu which is related to sea trading culture of the past. It was believed to have belonged to a merchant community called Valanjiyar belonging to left-hand caste group in the past. However, now Saliyas conduct this ritual. But relationship between Valanjiyar and Saliya communities at present is still a speculation.

See also
Nesa Nayanar
Kaikolar
Padmasali

References and notes

Additional references
 Caste and Race in India by G.S. Ghurye
 Report on Growth and Prospects of the Handloom industry.

Indian castes
Social groups of Kerala
Social groups of Tamil Nadu
Weaving communities of South Asia
Other Backward Classes